Klondike Wind farm is located in Sherman County, east of the small agricultural community of Wasco, in the north-central part of the U.S. state of Oregon. It was built in four phases and is owned and operated by Iberdrola.
The first phase was built in 2001 and the latest in 2008.

The wind farm is currently a test site for some new wind turbines, notably the Mitsubishi MWT92, a 2.4 megawatt turbine with a rotor diameter larger than the wingspan of any production aircraft at 92 meters, manufactured in Japan. During the construction of the last phase, an accident killed one worker and injured another.

References

External links

 Phase I

Energy infrastructure completed in 2001
Energy infrastructure completed in 2008
Buildings and structures in Sherman County, Oregon
Wind farms in Oregon
2001 establishments in Oregon